Stompwijk is a village in the Dutch province of South Holland. It is located between the cities Leiden and Zoetermeer and is part of the municipality of Leidschendam-Voorburg.

Stompwijk was a separate municipality between 1817 and 1938, when it merged with Veur to create the new municipality of Leidschendam.

People born in Stompwijk
Edwin Vurens (1968), football player
Cees Juffermans (1982), marathon speed skater

References

External links
Coat of arms of Stompwijk

Populated places in South Holland
Former municipalities of South Holland